The year 1760 in architecture involved some significant events.

Buildings and structures

Buildings

 The Laleli Mosque ("Tulip Mosque") in Istanbul is begun (completed in 1763).
 St. George's Cathedral, Lviv, Ukraine, designed by Bernard Meretin, is completed.
 Servite Church, Vienna, designed by Martin Carlone, is consecrated.
 Santa Maria della Pietà, Venice, designed by Giorgio Massari, is completed.
 Most Holy Trinity Church, Fulnek, Moravia, designed by Nikolaus Thalherr, is completed.
 Østre Porsgrunn Church in Telemark, Norway, designed by Lauritz de Thurah and Andreas Pfützner and built by Joen Jacobsen, is consecrated.
 Holy Trinity Church, Warrington, England, is completed.
 Interior rococo church decoration of the Monastery of São Martinho de Tibães in northern Portugal, designed by André Soares, is completed.
 Reredos of Our Lady of Light in Christo Rey Church, Santa Fe, New Mexico, is erected.
 Reconstruction of St. Cyril's Monastery in Kiev by Ivan Hryhorovych-Barskyi is completed.
 Castellania in Valletta, completed by Giuseppe Bonnici to a design by Francesco Zerafa, is opened.
 Edinburgh City Chambers, designed by John Adam as the Royal Exchange, is opened.
 Hagley Hall in Worcestershire, England, designed by Sanderson Miller, is completed.
 Brockdorff's Palace in Copenhagen is completed.
 Grassalkovich Palace in Bratislava is built.
 Palazzo Estense in Varese, Lombardy, designed by Giuseppe Bianchi, is completed.
 Selo Mansion in Ljubljana.
 New country house at Sølyst (Klampenborg) near Copenhagen is built.
 Arno's Court Triumphal Arch in Bristol, England, designed by James Bridges, is built.
 In Amalfi, at Duomo square, a Baroque fountain is built.
 In Cortona, Tuscany, La Mucchia casa vacanze, a typical Tuscan farmhouse, is built by Count Passerini of Cortona.
 Stockholm Palace in Stockholm, Sweden is completed.
 The Old Brick Market, a "handsome expression of civic and commercial life" designed by Peter Harrison, opens in Newport, Rhode Island

Births
September 30 – Michele Cachia, Maltese architect and military engineer (died 1839)
date unknown
 James Cavanah Murphy, Irish-born architect and antiquary (died 1814)
 Willey Reveley, English architect (died 1799)

Deaths
 November 20 – Giovanni Carlo Galli-Bibiena, Italian architect and designer (born 1717)

References

Architecture
Years in architecture
18th-century architecture